The WTA Congoleum Classic is a defunct WTA Tour affiliated tennis tournament played in 1983. It was held in Palm Springs, California in the United States and played on outdoor hard courts.

Finals

Singles

Doubles

References
 WTA Results Archive

 
Defunct tennis tournaments in the United States
Hard court tennis tournaments in the United States
WTA Tour